In economics, the Backus–Smith puzzle or consumption – real-exchange-rate anomaly is the observation that the correlations between consumption and real exchange rates are zero or negative.  This is contrary to economic theory which predicts that with full risk sharing, relative consumption should be perfectly correlated with the real exchange rate. Countries with relative low prices should receive a transfer to take advantage of cheap consumption.  This anomaly was first documented by Backus and Smith (1993).

References 

International finance
International macroeconomics
Economic puzzles